Youssef Sekour (born 27 February 1988) is a professional footballer who last played as a midfielder for Olympique Khouribga. Born in France, he represented Morocco at under-20 international level.

Career

Club career
Sekour joined Kuwaiti club Al-Yarmouk in August 2019. His contract was terminated in May 2020.

References

External links
 Youssef Sekour at Footballdatabase
 

1987 births
Living people
People from Istres
French sportspeople of Moroccan descent
Association football midfielders
Moroccan footballers
French footballers
FC Girondins de Bordeaux players
FC Nantes players
CS Sedan Ardennes players
Lierse S.K. players
Lillestrøm SK players
Diósgyőri VTK players
Lombard-Pápa TFC footballers
Ittihad Tanger players
Umm Salal SC players
Qatar Stars League players
Ligue 2 players
Nemzeti Bajnokság I players
Moroccan expatriate footballers
French expatriate footballers
Expatriate footballers in Belgium
Expatriate footballers in Norway
Expatriate footballers in Hungary
Expatriate footballers in Qatar
Expatriate footballers in Kuwait
French expatriate sportspeople in Belgium
French expatriate sportspeople in Norway
French expatriate sportspeople in Hungary
French expatriate sportspeople in Qatar
French expatriate sportspeople in Kuwait
Moroccan expatriate sportspeople in Belgium
Moroccan expatriate sportspeople in Norway
Moroccan expatriate sportspeople in Hungary
Moroccan expatriate sportspeople in Qatar
Moroccan expatriate sportspeople in Kuwait
Sportspeople from Bouches-du-Rhône
Footballers from Provence-Alpes-Côte d'Azur